John Spearman (born 1928) is an American former Negro league third baseman who played in the 1940s.

Spearman played for the New York Black Yankees in 1945. In three recorded games, he posted one hit in ten plate appearances.

References

External links
 and Seamheads

1928 births
Date of birth missing (living people)
Place of birth missing (living people)
New York Black Yankees players
Baseball third basemen
Living people